Dharakote Jagannath Temple is a Jagannath temple located in Dharakote of Ganjam district in the Indian state of Odisha.

The temple is built in contemporary Kalinga architecture, similar to the Jagannath Temple, Puri. It is known among locals for its Ekadasi Cart festival.

The foundation was laid by Raja Jai Singh in 1732 and was completed by Raja Madan Mohan Singh Deo of Dharakote Zamindari.

Geography
Dharakote is located 23 km from Surada, and 55 km from Brahmapur in NH-59.

List of Dharakote Rajas
 Raja Hadu Singh 1476-1540
 Raja Rai Singh 1540-1602
 Raja Narayan Singh 1602-1647
 Raja Purushottam Singh 1647-1699
 Raja Ram Chandra Singh 1699-1731
 Raja Jai Singh 1731-1748
 Raja Rajendra Singh 1748-1780
 Raja Damodar Singh 1780
 Raja Krushna Singh 1780-1788
 Raja Jaganath Singh 1788-1830
 Raja Raghunath Singh 1830-1863
 Raja Braja Sundar Singh 1863-1880
 Raja Madan Mohan Singh DEO 1880-1937
 Raja Brajkishore Singh DEO 1937-1938
 Raja Padmanabh Singh DEO 1946-1949
 Raja Anant Narayan Singh Deo 1974-2003
 Raja Kishore Chandra Singh Deo 2003-2010
 Rani Sulakshana Geetanjali Devi (2010-current titular ruler)

References

Hindu temples in Ganjam district
Temples dedicated to Jagannath